Daniel Vachez (3 October 1946 – 15 March 2021) was a French politician. A member of the Socialist Party, he served as mayor of Noisiel from 1980 until 2017 and as a member of the National Assembly for Seine-et-Marne's 8th constituency from 1997 until 2002.

Life 

Vachez worked in a bank before moving to Noisiel. He became deputy mayor of Noisiel in 1977 and mayor in 1980.

Vachez was a member of the National Assembly from 1997 to 2002.

In 2014 Vachez was promoted to the rank of Chevalier of the Légion d'honneur. He resigned as mayor of Noisiel in 2017.

Vachez died on 15 March 2021 and was survived by his wife, children and grandchildren.

References

1946 births
2021 deaths
Politicians from Lyon
Socialist Party (France) politicians
Mayors of places in Île-de-France 
Members of the National Assembly (France)
Deputies of the 11th National Assembly of the French Fifth Republic
Chevaliers of the Légion d'honneur